Sergei Sergeyevich Prikhodko (born 9 May 1984) is a former Russian football goalkeeper.

Club career
His father, also Sergei, is a former goalkeeper who coached his son while an assistant at  FC Zenit Saint Petersburg. They both moved to Russian Football National League club FC Sokol-Saratov in 2005.

External links 
Profile on Official Website
Interview with Prihodko
 

1984 births
Footballers from Saint Petersburg
Living people
Russian footballers
Association football goalkeepers
FC Zenit-2 Saint Petersburg players
FC Sokol Saratov players
FC Sheksna Cherepovets players
FC Chornomorets Odesa players
JK Narva Trans players
FC Znamya Truda Orekhovo-Zuyevo players
Ukrainian Premier League players
Meistriliiga players
Russian expatriate footballers
Expatriate footballers in Ukraine
Russian expatriate sportspeople in Ukraine
Expatriate footballers in Estonia
Russian expatriate sportspeople in Estonia